Gimbel Brothers (known simply as Gimbels) was an American department store corporation that operated for over a century, from 1842 until 1987. Gimbel patriarch Adam Gimbel opened his first store in Vincennes, Indiana, in 1842. In 1887, the company moved its operations to the Gimbel Brothers Department Store in Milwaukee, Wisconsin. It became a chain when it opened a second, larger store in Philadelphia, Pennsylvania, in 1894, moving its headquarters there. At the urging of future company president Bernard Gimbel, grandson of the founder, the company expanded to New York City in 1910.

The company is known for creating the oldest Thanksgiving parade, the Gimbels Thanksgiving Day Parade, originating in 1920 in Philadelphia. Gimbels was also considered the chief rival of Macy's with their feud popularized in American culture. As of 1930, Gimbels had grown to 20 stores, whose sales revenue made it the largest department store chain in the world. The company expanded to a peak of 53 stores by 1965, and closed in 1987 with 35 stores in Pennsylvania, New York, New Jersey, Wisconsin, and Connecticut.

History

Early history 

The company was founded by a young Bavarian Jewish immigrant, Adam Gimbel, who opened a general store in Vincennes, Indiana. After a brief stay in Danville, Illinois, Gimbel relocated in 1887 to Milwaukee, Wisconsin, which was then a boomtown heavily populated by German immigrants. The new store quickly became the leading department store there. However, with seven sons, Adam Gimbel saw the opportunity to expand elsewhere.

In 1894, Gimbels—then led by the founder's son, Isaac Gimbel—acquired the Granville Haines store (originally built and operated by Cooper and Conard) in Philadelphia, Pennsylvania, and in 1910, opened another branch in New York City. With its arrival in New York, Gimbels prospered, and soon became the primary rival to the leading Herald Square retailer, Macy's, whose flagship store was located a block north. This rivalry entered into the American popular argot as "Does Macy's tell Gimbels?", an idiom used to brush off any query about matters the speaker didn't wish to divulge. To distinguish itself from Herald Square neighbors, Gimbels' advertising promised more: "Select, don't settle."

Gimbels became so successful that in 1922 the chain went public, offering shares on the New York Stock Exchange (though the family retained a controlling interest). The stock sales provided capital for expansion, starting with the 1923 purchase of across-the-street rival Saks & Co., which operated under the name Saks-34th Street; with ownership of Saks, Gimbel created an uptown branch called Saks Fifth Avenue. Moving into radio, Gimbels purchased WGBS in New York and WIP in Philadelphia. In 1925, Gimbels entered the Pittsburgh market with the purchase of Kaufmann & Baer's, acquiring WCAE in the deal. Although expansion spurred talk of the stores becoming a nationwide chain, the Great Depression ended that prospect. Gimbel did increase the number of more upscale (and enormously profitable) Saks Fifth Avenue stores in the 1930s, opening branches in Chicago, Boston and San Francisco.

Success 
By 1930, Gimbels had seven flagship stores throughout the country and sales of $123 million ($ billion today) across 20 stores; this made Gimbel Brothers Inc. the largest department store corporation in the world. By 1953, sales had risen to $300 million ($ billion today). In 1962, Gimbels acquired Milwaukee competitor Schuster's, and in that region operated stores from both chains for a while as Gimbels Schuster's. By 1965, Gimbel Brothers Inc. consisted of 53 stores throughout the country, which included 22 Gimbels, 27 Saks Fifth Avenue stores, and four Saks 34th St.

Gimbels and the middle class 
Gimbels' principles and merchandise sought to reflect the ideals of middle class America.  Their principles consisted of "courtesy, reliability, good value, and enlightened management".  By using middle class values Gimbels attracted shoppers to a store that also could fit their budgets.  Keeping the store plain and less extravagant than some of its competitors, Gimbels used the slogan "the customer pays for fancy frills." Gimbels was about the product, not the aesthetics. By offering a wide range of cutting-edge technology in its merchandise, Gimbels reflected the ideals held by the middle class of staying up to date with technologies and carrying new appliances and merchandise at an affordable price.

Merchandise 
Gimbels Department Store offered a variety of merchandise and products, including home appliances, outdoor equipment, furniture, clothing, and much more. With multiple floors in its flagship stores, each floor offered a given category of merchandise. The Philadelphia Gimbels specifically offered fine jewelry, men's clothing, women's clothing, children's clothing, furniture, toys, art supplies, and appliances for the house. This store also contained The Gimbel Auditorium, Television Headquarters, a salon, and music center. With a wide variety of options Gimbels was a one stop shop that made shopping easy and accessible.

Publicity 
Despite its limited presence, Gimbels was well-known nationwide, in part because of the carefully cultivated rivalry with Macy's, but also thanks to an endless stream of publicity. The New York store received considerable attention as the site of the 1939–1940 sale of art and antiquities from the William Randolph Hearst collection. Gimbels also gained publicity from the 1947 film Miracle on 34th Street, the 1967 film Fitzwilly, and was frequently mentioned as a shopping destination of Lucy Ricardo and Ethel Mertz on the hit 1950s TV series I Love Lucy.

The Slinky made its debut at the northeast Philadelphia Gimbels store. Also, the Philadelphia Gimbels was the first department store in the world to move customers from floor to floor via the escalator.

Gimbels Thanksgiving Day Parade 

The idea of a department-store parade originated in 1920 with Gimbels Department Store in Philadelphia with the parade now known as the 6abc Dunkin' Donuts Thanksgiving Day Parade.  The Gimbel family saw the parade as a way to promote holiday shopping at its various store locations.  Macy's did not start a parade until 1924.  When Gimbels ceased operating in 1986, television station WPVI assumed responsibility for the parade, with sponsorship by Reading, Pennsylvania-based Boscov's.  Currently, Dunkin' Donuts is the chief sponsor of the parade.

Acquisition and closure 
Brown & Williamson, the American subsidiary of British American Tobacco, a diversified conglomerate based in Louisville, Kentucky, acquired Gimbels in 1973. Brown & Williamson also owned Marshall Field's (purchased in 1982), Frederick & Nelson, The Crescent stores, and Kohl's (purchased in 1972). Brown & Williamson later created the BATUS Retail Group as a subsidiary company for its retail holdings.

BATUS initially left the Gimbels chain in the four autonomous divisions that had been established under Gimbel family ownership: Gimbels New York, Gimbels Philadelphia, Gimbels Pittsburgh, and Gimbels Milwaukee. Each division operated independently of each other in advertising and buying. Each division offered their own charge card which could only be used at Gimbels stores in the same division. In 1983, Gimbels New York and Gimbels Philadelphia were combined into a single entity, Gimbels East, in an attempt to reduce corporate overhead.

Deciding that Gimbels was a marginal performer with little potential for increased profitability, BATUS in 1986 decided to close its Gimbels division and sell its store properties. Some of the more attractive branches were taken over by Stern's (Allied Stores), Pomeroy's (Allied Stores), Kaufmann's (May Department Stores), or Boston Store. The cornerstone of the chain, the downtown Milwaukee store where Adam Gimbel had first found success (and supposedly the most profitable Gimbel store), was handed to BATUS sister division Marshall Field's, but eventually closed in 1997.

Store divisions 
Gimbels flagship stores were located in New York City, Philadelphia, Pittsburgh, Milwaukee, and Detroit.

New York flagship store 

The Gimbels New York City flagship store was located in the cluster of large department stores that surrounded Herald Square, in Midtown Manhattan. Designed by architect Daniel Burnham, the structure, which once offered  of sales space, has since been modernized and entirely revamped. When this building opened, on September 29, 1910, a major selling point was its many doors leading to the Herald Square New York City Subway station. Due to such easy access, by the time Gimbels closed in 1986, this store had the highest rate of "shrinkage", or shoplifting losses, in the world. Doors also opened to a pedestrian passage under 32nd Street, connecting Penn Station to the 34th Street (New York City Subway) and 33rd Street (PATH) stations.  This Gimbels Passageway was closed in the 1990s for security reasons during a period of high crime.

The structure was converted to a mall in 1989, today known as the Manhattan Mall. It originally included an anchor department store that was first a midtown branch of Brooklyn's A&S, which became a Stern's in 1995. That anchor store closed in 2001 and the space was subdivided within the mall. A new JCPenney anchor store opened in 2009, in the lower two levels. That anchor store closed in 2020.

The building that housed a Gimbels branch at 86th Street and Lexington Avenue remains, but has been converted to apartments.

Philadelphia flagship 
The Philadelphia flagship opened in 1893 when the Gimbel brothers bought the bankrupt Haines and Company dry goods store at Ninth and Market Streets. The store gradually expanded eastward to Eighth Street. In 1927 an extension south to Chestnut Street was completed and the store now comprised an entire city block. In 1977 Gimbels moved to The Gallery mall across Market Street. The original buildings were demolished in 1979-1980 except for the 1927 addition which was converted to professional office spaces. The Gallery location closed in 1986.

Pittsburgh flagship 
In Pittsburgh, Starrett & van Vleck designed the downtown flagship of the Gimbels Department Store, which was built in 1914 at 339 Sixth Avenue.  After Gimbels ceased operations in the late 1980s, the building sat vacant for several years and was redeveloped in the 1990s for retail, home to, among other shops, the first Barnes & Noble to open in Pittsburgh. In 2002, another redevelopment changed the building to offices, and is now home to the Heinz 57 Center. In 1997, it was added to the list of historic landmarks by the Pittsburgh History and Landmarks Foundation.

Relationship to Saks 
Saks was founded by Horace Saks in New York City. In 1923, Gimbels purchased Saks, which became a subsidiary of Gimbel Brothers, Incorporated, a publicly traded company.  Adam Long Gimbel, grandson of the founder of Gimbels, Adam Gimbel, turned Saks into a national brand. In 1973, Brown & Williamson, who later formed BATUS Inc., acquired Gimbel Bros. and the Saks Fifth Avenue brand. BATUS closed Gimbels in 1986, and subsequently sold Saks to Investcorp S.A. in 1990.

In popular culture
Gimbels is featured prominently in Fitzwilly, a 1967 Christmas classic heist film.

Although the store had been closed for sixteen years, the New York City location was a primary setting for the 2003 film Elf. Exterior shots were filmed at the Textile Building at 295 Fifth Avenue with visual effects added later, while interior shots were filmed in the 34th Street Macy's flagship store.

In The Goldbergs, Erica, played by Hayley Orrantia, was portrayed working as a cashier in Gimbels' Philadelphia store. The series, set in the 1980s, also depicts the closing of Gimbels.

Gimbel Brothers is the department store Number Five breaks into to remove the mannequin Dolores in "Run Boy Run", the second episode of Netflix's The Umbrella Academy.

Gimbels was the main rival to Macy's in Miracle on 34th Street (1947), and "Mr. Gimbel" even tries to show up Mr. Macy in thanking Kris Kringle for the new policy of referring customers to another store for Christmas shopping.

The 2021 remake of West Side Story has the lead character Maria and her friends working at Gimbels as cleaning ladies.

Gallery

References

Bibliography
 Ferry, John William. A History of the Department Store. New York: The Macmillan Company, 1960.
 Harris, Leon.  Merchant Princes.  New York:  Harper & Row, 1979.
 Lisicky, Michael. Gimbels Has It!. Charleston: The History Press, 2011.
 Mahoney, Tom, and Sloane, Leonard.  The Great Merchants:  America's Foremost Retail Institutions and the People Who Made Them Great.  New York:  Harper & Row, 1974.

1887 establishments in Wisconsin
1987 disestablishments in New York (state)
American companies established in 1887
British American Tobacco
Defunct companies based in New York City
Defunct department stores based in New York City
Economy of Milwaukee
Economy of New York City
Retail companies disestablished in 1987
Retail companies established in 1887
American companies disestablished in 1987